Brostugan is a restaurant in Kärsön, Stockholm, Sweden. It is located in a building dating from the 1700s on the southern side of Nockebybron within Ekerö Municipality.

History

Brostugan was originally built in the 1780s and became the residence of the bridge-keeper when Gustavus III had built the first bridge between Kärsön and Drottningholm Palace in 1787. Brostugan served as the house of the bridge-keeper until 1931, whose job was to open the bridge and collects tolls. The upper floors were rented to summer visitors and one of the most famous tenants was Hjalmar Söderberg. He spent the summer there in 1876 aged seven, which he describes in his autobiographical book, Martin Birck's Youth.

In 1932, Brostugan was renovated and redesigned by architect Ivar Tengbom and the same year a restaurant with a bakery opened. During the summer people would sit outside on the terrace. Three generations of one family leased the restaurant until 1990, when a new tenant took over.

Architecture
The house is of timber trim and pale yellow in color. Corners and windows are marked with white. Porch columns have been shown to be identical to those pillars that once stood in the Hall at the Royal Palace, they were transported along with many other interior materials out to Drottningholm in 1788. Since 1991, Brostugan and the surroundings of the Drottningholm Palace have been a UNESCO World Heritage Site and officially part of Sweden's protected heritage.

References

External links
Official site

Buildings and structures completed in the 18th century
Restaurants in Stockholm
1932 establishments in Sweden
Restaurants established in 1932